Akokana FC  (Akokana FC d'Arlit ) is a semi-professional Football club based in the  city of Arlit, Niger.  They regularly appear in the Niger Premier League.

References

 Rec Sports Soccer Foundation: Niger 2008: Championnat national de première division.
 UEMOA Cup, Niger qualifying page, 2008.

Football clubs in Niger
Super Ligue (Niger) clubs